Urban Rural Trade Unionist Party of Peru (in Spanish: Partido Sindicalista Rural Urbano del Perú) was a political party in Peru.  It was founded in 1939 by Jorge Badani.

1939 establishments in Peru
Defunct political parties in Peru
Political parties established in 1939
Political parties with year of disestablishment missing